Bae So-ra (born 22 July 1991) is a South Korean field hockey player for the South Korean national team.

She participated at the 2018 Women's Hockey World Cup.

References

1991 births
Living people
South Korean female field hockey players
Female field hockey goalkeepers
Universiade gold medalists for South Korea
Universiade medalists in field hockey
Medalists at the 2013 Summer Universiade
21st-century South Korean women